Samuel Black was a member of the Wisconsin State Assembly.

Biography
Black was born on July 4, 1827, in what was then part of Sangamon County, Illinois. During the American Civil War, he was a captain with the 85th Illinois Volunteer Infantry Regiment the Union Army. Operations he took part in include the Confederate Heartland Offensive. After resigning from the Army as a result of ill health, Black began farming in Dunn County, Wisconsin. He died on February 18, 1916.

Political career
Black was a member of the Assembly during the 1877 session. Other positions he held include County Clerk of Dunn County, town chairman (similar to mayor) and justice of the peace. He was a Republican.

References

External links

People from Sangamon County, Illinois
People from Dunn County, Wisconsin
Republican Party members of the Wisconsin State Assembly
Mayors of places in Wisconsin
County clerks in Wisconsin
American justices of the peace
People of Illinois in the American Civil War
Union Army officers
Farmers from Wisconsin
1827 births
1916 deaths
Burials in Wisconsin
19th-century American judges
Military personnel from Wisconsin